Ivanovka is a rural locality (a village) in Balyklinsky Selsoviet, Fyodorovsky District, Bashkortostan, Russia. The population was 11 as of 2010. There is 1 street.

Geography 
Ivanovka is located 22 km southeast of Fyodorovka (the district's administrative centre) by road. Petrovka is the nearest rural locality.

References 

Rural localities in Fyodorovsky District